Buitenweg is the surname of:

 Kathalijne Buitenweg (27 March 1970), Dutch politician
 Wout Buitenweg (24 December 1893 – 10 November 1976), Dutch football player